Grande Fratello VIP 3 (as known by the acronym GFVIP3)  is the third celebrity season of the Italian reality television franchise Grande Fratello.

It was launched on 24 September 2018 on Canale 5, with Ilary Blasi as presenter of the gala show on air every week, and Alfonso Signorini as opinionist, and Gialappa's Band. It will end on 10 December 2018. The 24h live stream is broadcast on Mediaset Extra, daily recaps are broadcast on Canale 5, Italia 1 and La 5. The show was scheduled to air for 11 weeks.

Housemates
The age of the housemates refers to the time of entry into the house.

Nominations table
 Blue team (Week 1 - 2)
 Red team (Week 1 - 2)
 Immune
 2-in-1 housemate, their nominations counted as one. (Week 1 - 8)

Week 1 - Week 8

Week 9 - Finale
 Tie-breaker vote

Note

: Housemates are divided into two teams. They are only able to nominate one housemate from their team.
: Maurizio walked from the house due to personal reasons.
: Stefano, favorite of the house, renounces his immunity to exchange with Benedetta.

TV Ratings

References

External links 
 Official site 

03